Michael Williams (born June 23, 1987) is an American film director, producer, screenwriter, cinematographer and editor born in West Point, Mississippi.

Life and career
Williams began creating short films in 2004 and since has consistently produced short films and screened them for audiences at annual film festivals and screenings across the U.S.
 
He earned his bachelor of arts in film in 2009 from the University of Southern Mississippi and was awarded the Top Film Student of 2009 Award. In 2007, Williams began his professional film career, accumulating a multitude of credits ranging from assistant camera to director of photography for many independent short and feature-length films.

After writing, directing and producing more than 20 short films, Williams broke into the feature-length film territory in 2014 with OzLand, a science fantasy drama inspired by characters and events in L. Frank Baum's The Wonderful Wizard of Oz. While his desire to tell complex stories visually drew him to a career in cinematography, as an artist and storyteller, Williams writes and directs films like OzLand in order to share his stories with those interested in experiencing them while eagerly pursuing the opportunity to bring other people's stories to life as a director of photography.
 
Today, the filmmaker owns and operates his own company, Shendopen, in West Point, Mississippi. He continues to write and direct his own independent films, produce films by other regional filmmakers and works regionally in the industry as a director of photography. His second feature film, The Atoning, marked his first entry into the horror genre and premiered at the Oxford Film Festival on February 18, 2017.

Filmography

References

Shendopen Productions

External links
 Official Website
 

1987 births
Living people
American film editors
American male screenwriters
Film directors from Mississippi
People from West Point, Mississippi
Screenwriters from Mississippi